Yandex.Market is a Russian free online service for the selection of goods and shopping. The service was launched on November 30, 2000 by Yandex. Since 2016, it is a separate company.

The service has a daily audience of over 4 million users and monthly audience of 20 million.

History 
On November 30, 2000 Yandex.Market was launched entitled «Yandex.Tovary» (literally «Yandex.Products») by employees of Yandex Dmitriy Zavalishin, Evgeniya Zavalishina and Ilya Polozhintsev. Heretofore, on October 16, 2000 was launched online consulting service Yandex.Guru that helped the user to choose a product using leading questions. In 2002 Yandex.Tovary, Yandex.Guru and online service Podberi.ru have been combined into Yandex.Market.

In June 2013 Yandex.Market opened a website section with the list of recommended online shops. The shop can get a «recommended» status after the conclusion of the contract with Yandex.Market. In 2015 Yandex.Market launched delivery service Yandex.Delivery.

In 2016 Yandex.Market has become a separate company.

In 2018 Yandex.Market and Sberbank launched a joint online marketplace «Beru». In 2020 it was closed and included into Yandex.Market.

In 2020 Yandex.Market rebranded marketplace «Beru» and became completely independent online marketplace itself.

Service work 

The general director of Yandex.Market is Daniil Shuleyko. Head office of the company is located in Lotte Plaza business center on the New Arbat Avenue in Moscow.

Users of service can search products by their parameters, view a products specifications, comparison of models and prices, product reviews and overviews, rating of shops, and buy this products.

In February 2020 was launched Yandex.Market Analytics: online platform with information about electronic equipment market in Russia. This service displays combined data on sales volumes and buyers characteristics (age, gender, geolocation, etc.).

References

External links 
 Official website

Yandex software